The 1964 Iraq Central FA Altruism Cup was the 3rd edition of the Iraq Central FA Perseverance Cup. The match was contested between the winners and runners-up of the 1963–64 edition of the Iraq Central FA League, Al-Quwa Al-Jawiya and Al-Firqa Al-Thalitha respectively. Al-Quwa Al-Jawiya won the game 3–0.

Match

Details

References

External links
 Iraqi Football Website

Football competitions in Iraq